Sin Fang is the stage name of Sindri Már Sigfússon, an Icelandic musician and member of the band Seabear.

History
Sindri founded the band Seabear in 2000, signing with the label Morr Music. Seabear was initially conceived as a solo project, but Sindri quickly added members; later in the 2000s, he began releasing solo albums under the name Sin Fang Bous. Shortening this to Sin Fang after the release of the Clangour album, Sindri has released four full-lengths as Sin Fang: Summer Echoes (2011), Flowers (2013), Spaceland (2016) and Sad Party (2019).

In 2017, take part in a collaborative project with fellow Icelandic artists, Sóley and Örvar Þóreyjarson Smárason (from the band Múm), which sees the trio release a new song each month, making twelve in total and released as Team Dreams in 2018.

Discography
Clangour (Morr Music, 2008)
Summer Echoes (Morr Music, 2011)
Flowers (Morr Music, 2013)
Spaceland (Morr Music, 2016)
Team Dreams (Morr Music, 2018)
Sad Party (Morr Music, 2019)

References

Icelandic musicians
Living people
Year of birth missing (living people)
Place of birth missing (living people)
Morr Music artists